Bowls Queensland (BQ) is the governing body for lawn bowls in Queensland, Australia.

History 

BQ in its current form has only existed since 2005. Previous to that, bowls in Queensland was governed by two separate organisations, the Royal Queensland Bowls Association (RQBA),established in 1903 and the Queensland Ladies Bowls Association (QLBA).

Currently, more than 40,000 Queenslanders are members of a BQ affiliated club.

Structure

Bowls Queensland is governed by a Board of Directors, including a chairman deputy chair, finance director and 4 ordinary directors.

A number of supporting committees assist the board, currently including:
Men's
Ladies
Coaching
Umpires
Match
Selection
Sports Connect

Strategic Plan
The current Bowls Queensland Strategic Plan is focused on these initiatives:
Increase funding 
Stabilise and then grow membership using Annual Report figures 
Lack of corporate governance and strategic planning programs for clubs and district 
Regular training and education of Board, Committees and staff members 
Succession planning for Board and Committees in BQ 
Assist clubs to implement programs for local demographics 
Implement new data base 
Communication to bowlers 
Ownership of Coorparoo

Clubs

There are over 600 bowls clubs in Queensland, with more than 40,000 members all up. Each club is part of one of 20 district associations.

CLUBS:
CAIRNS & Far north: Gordovale bowls club, Edmonton bowls club, West Cairns Bowls club, Stratford Bowls club, Marlin Coast bowls club, Edge Hill Bowls club, Mossman bowls club, Mareeba bowls club, Yungaburra bowls club, Weipa bowls club

Central Queensland: Charters Towers bowls club, Hughenden bowls club, Richmond bowls club, Cloncurry bowls club

Brisbane: Coorparoo bowls club, Merthyr bowls club, New Farm bowls club

GOLD Coast: Helensvale Bowls club, Musgrave hill bowls club, Southport bowls club, Burleigh heads bowls club, BroadBeach bowls club, Tugun bowls club

Former clubs: Masonic Bowls club (Cairns), Cairns Bowls club, Surfers Paradise bowls club, Townsville city lawn bowls club, East Brisbane bowls club, South Brisbane Bowls club, Moorooka bowls club

QLBA

Organisation 

BQ is run by a board of directors. The board's chair, deputy chair and Director of Finance are elected annually by BQ's member districts. The four other directors are elected on a two-year rotational term, that sees two of the directors standing for election each year.

A number of committees assist the board, including:
Men's
Ladies
Coaching
Umpires
Match
Selection
Sports Connect

Events

Champion of Champions 

The state Champion of Champions is an annual event run by BQ. Club champions in singles, pairs and fours compete against other champions in their district. Whoever wins the district competition, moves on to the state champion of champions. This year's champion of champions will be held at Bribie Island Bowls Club from 22 to 27 October 2011.

Previous winners include Mark Casey, Nathan Rice, Lynsey Armitage as well as a host of other Australian representatives.

Women's

Junior Bowlers 
Junior bowlers from across the state converge once a year for a week to compete in the Junior State Championships. The Junior State Championships divisions include U18 Boys Singles, U18 Girls Singles, Under 15 Boys Singles, Under 15 Girls Singles, Under 18 Open Pairs, Under 15 Open Pairs, Open Triples and Open Fours. The location of the competition is subject to change every year.

Disabled Bowls 

There are four divisions of disabled bowls in Queensland - blind, deaf, physical disabilities and intellectual disabilities. Bowls Queensland took over the organisation of the state disabled bowls championships in 2011. In this first year, BQ combined the previously separate competitions of Queensland Blind Bowlers Association, Deaf Bowlers, Lifestream (intellectual disabilities) and Sporting Wheelies (physical disabilities).

The winners of each section qualify for the disabled draw of the Australian bowls open.

State Squads 

The current state squads are listed below

Men

Women

Under 25's

Men

Women

Under 18's

Boys

Girls

Australian Representatives 

Queensland has supplied 26 men and 23 women to the Australian team since 1950. Lynsey Armitage, a current representative, was also named the first ever Australian bowls captain.

Here is a full list of Queenslanders who have played bowls for Australia, in order of selection

Men 
Robert Lewis (1950)
Albert Palm (1950)
Ronald Marshall (1958)
Allan Rafton (1958)
Keith Dwyer (1964)
Edward Holden (1970)
Alan Schulte (1970)
Stan Coomber (1972)
Keith Poole OAM (1974–85)
Errol Stewart (1974)
Clive White (1974)
Bruno Panazzo (1978)
Robbie Dobbins (1982)
Robert Parrella (1982–94)
Kevin Henricks (1986)
Trevor Morris (1987–93)
Steven Anderson (1990–2003)
 Kelvin Kerkow OAM (1995- )
Bill Cornehls (2001–08)
Mark Casey (2003-)
 Nathan Rice (2004- )
Anthony Kiepe (2007- )
Robbie Thompson (2008–09)
Brett Wilkie (2009- )
Sean Baker (2011 - )

Women 
Eileen Lowe (1967)
Jean Turnbull (1969)
Delcie McCollom (1981)
 Patricia Smith (1982–85)
Menice Murray (1983)
Phyllis Kelly (1985)
Greeta Fahey (1986–89)
Edda Bunutto (1987–92)
Di Cunnington (1989)
Maureen Hobbs (1990)
Audrey Rutherford (1990–95)
 Maisie Flynn (1991)
Dorothy Lergesner (1994)
Judith Nash (1994–95)
Marilyn Peddell (1996–2001)
Jenny Harragon (1998–2004)
Lynsey Armitage (2003- )
Helen Bosisto (2003)
Maria Rigby (2003–2006)
Kelsey Cottrell (2005- )
Ceri Ann Davies (2006–07)
Noi Tucker (2006–07)
Julie Keegan (2007- )
Rebecca Quail (2011- )

Hall of Famers

The first inductees into the Australian bowls Hall of Fame were announced in 2011.Five Queenslanders were inducted on this inaugural announcement.

Robert Parrella OAM
Keith Poole MBC
 Ian Schuback OAM
Lynsey Armitage
 Kelvin Kerkow OAM

Publication

BQ produces Queensland Bowler, a monthly publication free of charge to all Queensland bowls clubs.  This magazine is also available on their website as a readable pdf.

References

External links 
 Bowls QLD website

Bowls in Australia
2005 establishments in Australia
Organizations established in 2005
1903 establishments in Australia
Sports organizations established in 1903
Sports governing bodies in Queensland
Bowling organizations